Sir Thomas Gery Cullum, 7th Baronet  (30 November 1741 – 8 September 1831) was a medical doctor educated at London Charterhouse and Trinity College, Cambridge, and who later practised surgery at Bury St. Edmunds, Suffolk, where he served as an alderman and Deputy Lieutenant for Suffolk.

Life
He was the son of Sir John Cullum, 5th Baronet, of Hardwick House, Hardwick, Suffolk. Sir John Cullum, 6th Baronet (1733–1785), his brother, was known as the "historian of Hawstead". H

Thomas Gery Cullum became 7th Baronet in 1785. He was a well-regarded writer on science and on botany and became a Fellow of the Royal Society, of the Society of Antiquaries of London and of the Linnaean Society.  He was recommended as a Fellow of the Royal Society in January 1787 along with James Smithson. Cullum also served as Bath King of Arms from 1771 to 1800. He was succeeded as Bath King of Arms by his son John Palmer Cullum, Esq, who served from 1800–1829: the pair served for nearly 60 years.

Cullum is buried in the church at Hawstead, Suffolk with many of his ancestors and descendants. Few churches in Suffolk have as many monuments to their dead, say scholars, as the church in Hawstead.

Residence

Cullum lived at Hardwick House, a Jacobean house on the site of medieval grazing land for St. Edmundsbury Abbey, which the Cullum family had owned from its initial purchase in 1656, by the Royalist Sir Thomas Cullum, 1st Baronet and former Sheriff of London, until 1921. Natives of Suffolk, the 1st baronet had grown rich as a London draper, then fallen out of favour on Cromwell's rise, but returned to favour on the Restoration, when he was rewarded with a Baronetcy.

The Cullum family had an extensive library, and had also taken great interest in the history of the area, including having authored several volumes on the history and antiquities of Hawsted and Hardwick. Following the sale of the Hardwick Estate, most of the Cullum library, the Cullum Collection, was given to the Bury Record Office. An oil portrait descended in the Levett family of Sir Thomas Gargrave, Speaker of the House of Commons, was donated to the National Portrait Gallery in London by the last Cullum baronet.

The house, which included a Venetian indoor riding school and extensive grounds, was demolished in 1921 when the last of the Cullums, George Gery Milner-Gibson Cullum, grandson of the 8th Baronet and High Sheriff of Suffolk, died without heirs.

The grounds and site of the formal gardens and statuary today constitute Hardwick Heath ( of the former Cullum estate turned into public parkland), the West Suffolk Hospital, the grounds of Hardwick Manor and housing developments. The site of Hardwick House itself is a wood bordering some original Cedar and Yew trees.

Legacy
Sir James Edward Smith dedicated his English Flora of 1824 to Cullum thus: 

"To Sir Thomas Gery Cullum, Bart., whose knowledge and love of natural science entitle him to the respect of all who follow the same pursuit, this work is inscribed in grateful and affectionate remembrance by the Author."

Smith's publications had followed a privately printed flora by Cullum, Floræ Anglicæ Specimen imperfectum et ineditum, 1774, which was based on the Linnean system of classification

A genus of flowering plant, Cullumia, commemorates the contribution of Cullum and his brother.

Family
Cullum married Mary Hanson of Normanton, West Yorkshire, daughter of Robert Hanson Esq. and heiress of her brother Levett Hanson, chamberlain to the Duke of Modena. On his death in Copenhagen without an heir, Hanson left his estate, including portraits and mementoes of the Levett and Gargrave families of Yorkshire, to his sister.

See also 
 List of Old Carthusians
 Hardwick House (Suffolk)
 Lady Drury's Closet

References

External links

Sir Thomas Gery Cullum, A General and Heraldic Dictionary of the Peerage and Baronetage of the British Empire, John Burke, 1832

1741 births
1831 deaths
People from Hawstead
People educated at Charterhouse School
English botanists
Antiquarians from London
Fellows of the Society of Antiquaries of London
Fellows of the Royal Society
Fellows of the Linnean Society of London
Order of the Bath
Baronets in the Baronetage of England
British surgeons
18th-century English medical doctors
19th-century English medical doctors